Bailu is a town under the administration of Guannan County, Jiangsu, China. , it has 24 villages under its administration.

References 

Township-level divisions of Jiangsu
Guannan County